Matthew Conlan may refer to:

 Matt Conlan (born 1968), Australian politician
 Matthew Conlan (hurler) (born 1993), Irish hurler